Fotbal Club Voluntari, commonly known as FC Voluntari or simply Voluntari, is a Romanian professional football club based in Voluntari, Ilfov County, which competes in the Liga I.

Founded in 2010, it has been playing since the 2015–16 season in the Liga I, the highest tier of the Romanian league system. Voluntari claimed its first major honour the following campaign, after defeating Astra Giurgiu in the penalty shootout of the Cupa României final, and went on to win the Supercupa României the same year.

Voluntari's home ground is the Anghel Iordănescu Stadium, which has a capacity of 4,600 people.

History

Early years
FC Voluntari was founded in the summer of 2010 and enrolled directly in the Liga III, after acquiring the berth of Petrolul Berca. 

During their debut season in the third league, Ilfovenii finished in sixth place with Romeo Bunică as a head coach, and repeated the performance the next season with Bogdan Andone in charge. The 2012–13 season began with poor performances and after five rounds Andone was replaced by Bunică, who led the team to the seventh place. 

Adrian Iencsi led Voluntari to winning the 2013–14 Liga III en fanfare, but despite the Liga II promotion, Iencsi was sacked and replaced for the next year by Ilie Poenaru. There, they had notable performances against Farul Constanța and CF Brăila, and then qualified to the Liga I from the first place via the promotion play-offs.

Promotion to the first division
Voluntari earned promotion for the first time in their history to Liga I, the highest tier of Romanian football, at the end of the 2014–15 campaign. Its debut season was difficult, as many technical and administrative changes led the club to the relegation zone. Finishing 12th, the team faced a promotion/relegation play-off against UTA Arad, which it won 3–1 on aggregate and maintained its place in the Liga I.

With experienced players such as Vasile Maftei, Florin Cernat or Laurențiu Marinescu in the starting eleven, Voluntari improved itself in the 2016–17 season, finishing in ninth place and avoiding a second consecutive promotion/relegation play-off. During that year, the club achieved its biggest achievement so far by winning the Cupa României over Astra Giurgiu, being the first major trophy in its brief history.

Stadium

The club plays its home matches at the 4,600-seater Stadionul Anghel Iordănescu in Voluntari. Attendances are usually modest, as Voluntari is considered a suburb of Bucharest and many of its citizens are inclined to support clubs from the capital instead.

Honours

Domestic

Leagues
Liga II
Winners (1):  2014–15
Liga III
Winners (1): 2013–14

Cups
Cupa României
Winners (1):  2016–17
Runners-up (1): 2021–22
Supercupa României
Winners (1):  2017

Players

First-team squad

Out on loan

Club officials

Board of directors

 Last updated: 6 September 2022
 Source:

Current technical staff

 Last updated: 6 September 2022
 Source:

Domestic records and statistics

Notable former players

Romania
  Cosmin Achim
  Ionuț Balaur
  Dragoș Balauru
  Adrian Bălan
  Mihai Căpățînă
  Florin Cernat
  Gabriel Tamaș
  Petre Ivanovici
  Costin Lazăr
  Vasile Maftei
  Florin Acsinte
  Daniel Pancu
  Dinu Todoran
  Florin Maxim
  Costin Curelea
  Laurențiu Marinescu
  Daniel Novac
  Alexandru Tudorie
  Mihai Voduț
  Gabriel Deac
  Mircea Bornescu
  Marius Briceag
  Alexandru Răuță
  Ion Gheorghe
 
Argentina
  Nicolás Gorobsov
Brazil
  Eric de Oliveira
Bulgaria
  Bozhidar Mitrev
Croatia
  Hrvoje Spahija
DR Congo
  Wilfred Moke
Greece
  Thanasis Papazoglou
Haiti
  Jean Sony Alcénat
Netherlands
  John Goossens
Spain
  Pablo de Lucas
  Jefté Betancor
Tunisia
  Aïssa Laïdouni

References

External links
 

Club profile on UEFA's official website
Club profile on LPF's official website

 
Association football clubs established in 2010
Football clubs in Ilfov County
Liga I clubs
Liga II clubs
Liga III clubs
2010 establishments in Romania